Masashi is a masculine Japanese given name. Notable people with the name include:

, Japanese skier
, Japanese actor
, Japanese animator and character designer
, Japanese baseball player
, Japanese manga artist
, Japanese basketball player
, Japanese baseball player
, Japanese voice actor
, Japanese judoka
, Japanese actor
, Japanese sprinter
, Japanese entertainer who lives in London
, Japanese politician
, Japanese actor
, Japanese composer
, Japanese voice actor
, Japanese basketball player
, Japanese politician
, Japanese holdout
, Japanese basketball player
Masashi Kameda, Japanese mixed martial artist
, Japanese footballer
, Japanese freestyle swimmer
, Japanese boxer
, Japanese manga artist
Masashi Kita, Japanese mixed martial artist
, Japanese voice actor
, Japanese footballer
, Japanese animator
, Japanese boxer
, Japanese volleyball player
, Japanese actor
, Japanese politician
, Japanese footballer
, Japanese footballer
, Japanese footballer
, Japanese fencer
, Japanese politician
, Japanese diver
, Japanese footballer
, Japanese baseball player
, Japanese judoka
, Japanese footballer
, Japanese Magic: The Gathering player
, Japanese cyclist
, Japanese field hockey player
, Japanese footballer
, Japanese pole vaulter
, Japanese footballer
, Japanese golfer
, Japanese professional wrestler
, Japanese singer
, Japanese basketball player
Masashi Shimada (born 1971), Japanese golfer
, Japanese comedian
, Japanese footballer
, Japanese voice actor
, Japanese professional wrestler
, Japanese manga artist
, Japanese television performer
, Japanese manga artist
, Japanese conductor, bassoonist
Masashi Usami, Japanese scientist
, Japanese footballer
, Japanese footballer
, Japanese politician
, Japanese footballer and manager
, Japanese film director
, Japanese baseball player

Japanese masculine given names